A circulator is an electrical device in which a signal entering any port is transmitted to the next port in rotation (only).

Circulator may also refer to:

 Optical circulator, the optical equivalent of a conventional circulator
 Circulator pump, a pump that is used to circulate gases, liquids, or slurries in a closed circuit
 Downtown circulator, a road or bus system that distributes traffic or people through a downtown area
 DC Circulator, a bus system in Washington, D.C.